The École Nationale Supérieure des Mines de Rabat (abbreviated as ENSMR), and called also Mines Rabat in French or Rabat School of Mines in English is a Grande école that is considered to be one of the most prestigious engineering schools in Morocco (consistently ranks in the top 3 engineering schools in Morocco).

The previous school's name was École Nationale de l'Industrie Minérale (abbreviated as ENIM)) or National School of the Mineral Industry in English.

Based in Rabat, Mines Rabat is one of the oldest engineering schools in Morocco. Mines Rabat is a member of the Conférence des grandes écoles (CGE). The course for the engineering program lasts three years and the admission is done mainly by the common national competition (CNC) after making two or three years of preparatory classes.

Despite its small size (around 300 students are accepted each year, after a very selective exam), it is a crucial part of the infrastructure of the Moroccan industry.

Rabat School of Mines (Mines Rabat) has similarities with Mines ParisTech, Mines Saint-Étienne, and Mines Nancy schools in France, Columbia School of Mines, Colorado School of Mines in the USA, and Royal School of Mines in the UK

Admissions
The admission to Mines Rabat in the normal cycle is made through a very selective entrance examination, and requires at least two years of preparation after high school in preparatory classes. Admission includes a week of written examinations during the spring followed sometimes by oral examinations over the summer.

Rankings 
Mines Rabat is ranked among the top 3 Moroccan Grandes Écoles, though it doesn't appear in international rankings due to its very limited number of students (300 students admitted for the class of 2021).

History
The school was established in 1972 and now about 300 Moroccan students are admitted each year. Foreign students, having followed a class préparatoire curriculum (generally, African students) can also enter through the same competitive exam. Finally, some foreign students come for a single year from other top institutions in Africa.

Preparatory classes: The classic admission path into Grandes Écoles
To enter the Diplôme d'Ingénieur curriculum of Grandes Écoles, students traditionally have to complete the first two years of their curriculum in the very intensive preparatory classes, most often in an institution outside the Grande École.

 University students pursuing an Associate of Science can take the university admission path examination: Admitted students admitted with associates from universities need to pursue a 3 years cycle of engineering at the school to get the "Diplôme d'Ingénieur"

 University graduates with one of the following degrees can also apply to get admitted to the engineering cycle of the school.

The Diplôme d'Ingénieur (Combined Bachelor's/Master's degree in Engineering)
Grandes Écoles of Engineering usually offers several master's degree programs, the most important of which is the Diplôme d'Ingénieur (Engineer's Degree equivalent to a combined BS/MS in Engineering).

Because of the strong selection of the students and of the very high quality of the curriculum, the Diplôme d'Ingénieur (combined BS/MS degree in Engineering)) gives the right to bear the title of an Ingénieur, is one of the most prestigious degrees in Morocco. The degree is protected by law and submitted to strict government supervision. It is more valued by companies than a university degree in terms of career opportunities and wages.
At the end of these preparatory classes, the students take nationwide, extremely selective competitive exams for entrance into Grandes Écoles, where they complete their curriculum for three years.

 1st year at Mines Rabat - equivalent to - senior year of BSc.
 2nd year at Mines Rabat - equivalent to - 1st year of MSc.
 3rd (final) year at Mines Rabat - equivalent to - 2nd year of MSc.

Doctoral program (DEng)
The school also has a doctoral program open to students with a master's degree or equivalent. Doctoral students generally work in the laboratories of the school; they may also work in external institutes or establishments. The Doctor of Engineering (DEng)  program takes three to five years to complete.

Programs
The Mines Rabat has multiple programs for the combined BS/MS in Engineering and the DEng:
 Civil Engineering
 Environmental Engineering
 Mining Engineering
 Process Engineering
 Energy Engineering
 Mechanical Engineering
 Computer Science
 Production Systems Engineering
 Industrial Engineering

Other schools of Mines in Morocco
 School of Industrial Management (EMINES)

Other schools of Mines in France
 École nationale supérieure des Mines d'Albi Carmaux (Mines Albi-Carmaux)
 École nationale supérieure des Mines d'Alès (Mines Alès)
 École nationale supérieure des Mines de Douai (Mines Douai)
 École nationale supérieure des Mines de Nancy
 École nationale supérieure des Mines de Nantes (Mines Nantes)
 École nationale supérieure des Mines de Paris (Mines ParisTech)
 École nationale supérieure des mines de Saint-Étienne (Mines Saint-Étienne)

Other schools of Mines in the USA
 Colorado School of Mines
 Columbia School of Mines

Other schools of Mines in the UK
 Royal School of Mines

Other schools of Mines in Canada
Goodman School of Mines

Other schools of Mines in Sweden
 Swedish School of Mines

Other schools of Mines in China
 China University of Mining and Technology

International
Agreements and cooperation with:
 France:
 École Centrale Paris, École Centrale de Lyon, École Centrale de Nantes
 Mines ParisTech, Mines Saint-Étienne, Mines Nancy
 Georgia Tech-Lorraine 
 INSA Lyon
 Switzerland:
École Polytechnique Fédérale de Lausanne
 Canada:
 Ecole Polytechnique de Montreal
 United States:
Columbia School of Mines
Georgia Institute of Technology
Colorado School of Mines
South Dakota School of Mines and Technology
 UK:
Imperial College London

References

External links
 Official website
 Mines Rabat on fr.wikipedia.org
 CGE
 Institut Mines-Télécom
 "Grandes Ecoles" organization scheme vs.  the classic university scheme
 Higher Education in France and the United States
 Ranking Web of Universities
 French-English translation for resume
 K12 Academics
 DEng vs. PhD - Doctor of Engineering
 List of CTI accredited programs

Education in Morocco